"The Gulshan-i-Raz-i-Jadid" ("New Garden of Secrets") is a poem in the Persian language written by Sir Muhammad Iqbal, as a part of his Zabur-i-Ajam collection.

See also 
 Index of Muhammad Iqbal–related articles

Poetry by Muhammad Iqbal